Yasujirō, Yasujiro or Yasujirou is a masculine Japanese given name.

Possible writings
Yasujirō can be written using different combinations of kanji characters. Here are some examples:

The characters used for "jiro" (二郎 or 次郎) literally means "second son" and usually used as a suffix to a masculine name, especially for the second child. The "yasu" part of the name can use a variety of characters, each of which will change the meaning of the name ("康" for healthy, "靖" for peaceful, "安" and so on).

康二郎, "healthy, second son"
靖次郎, "peaceful, second son"
安二郎, "tranquil, second son"
保次郎, "preserve, second son"
泰二郎, "peaceful, second son"

Other combinations...

康治郎, "healthy, to manage/cure, son"
康次朗, "healthy, next, clear"
靖治郎, "peaceful, to manage/cure, son"
安次朗, "tranquil, next, clear"
保次朗, "preserve, next, clear"

The name can also be written in hiragana やすじろう or katakana ヤスジロウ.

Notable people with the name
, Japanese vice admiral
, Japanese scientist
, Japanese film director
, Japanese film director
, Japanese politician

Japanese masculine given names